Photinia lasiopetala is a species of flowering plant in the family Rosaceae. It is endemic to Taiwan.  It is threatened by habitat loss.

References

Flora of Taiwan
lasiopetala
Vulnerable plants
Taxonomy articles created by Polbot